Figure skating at the 2023 European Youth Olympic Winter Festival was held from 25 to 27 January 2023 at the Ice Stadium "Claudio Vuerich" in Pontebba, Italy. Medals were awarded in boys' and girls' singles. To be eligible, skaters must have been born between 1 July 2006 and 30 June 2008.

Russia and Belarus were suspended following the 2022 Russian invasion of Ukraine and did not participate.

Schedule

Medal summary

Medalists

Medals by country

Entries
Member nations and their respective Olympic committees began announcing entries in October 2022. The complete list of entries was published on 22 January 2023.

Results

Boys

Girls

References

External links 
 EYOF 2023 at the International Skating Union
 
 Results

2023
European Youth Olympic Winter Festival
2023 European Youth Olympic Winter Festival events
International figure skating competitions hosted by Italy